Odessa Ice Cream Company Building is a historic commercial building and ice cream factory located at Odessa, Lafayette County, Missouri.  It was built in 1929, and is a two-story, three bay by five bay, clay block and brick building.  The rear section was raised to two stories about 1946. Odessa Ice Cream was the official ice cream at the Missouri State Fair in the 1930s.

It was listed on the National Register of Historic Places in 1996.

References

Commercial buildings on the National Register of Historic Places in Missouri
Commercial buildings completed in 1929
Buildings and structures in Lafayette County, Missouri
National Register of Historic Places in Lafayette County, Missouri
1929 establishments in Missouri